Clubul Sportiv Minerul Mehedinți, commonly known as Minerul Mehedinți or Minerul Valea Copcii, was a Romanian football club based in Valea Copcii, Mehedinți County, founded in 1994 and dissolved in 2015. At its best, Minerul was ranked 3rd in the Liga III.

Honours
Liga IV – Mehedinți County
Winners (2): 2002–03, 2013–14

Former managers 
 Cornel Mihart [2007–2009]
 Flavius Stoican [2009–2010]

References

Association football clubs established in 1994
Association football clubs disestablished in 2015
Defunct football clubs in Romania
Football clubs in Mehedinți County
Liga III clubs
Liga IV clubs
Mining association football teams in Romania
1994 establishments in Romania
2015 disestablishments in Romania